Mornington Island (Chile) is an island in the Magallanes y la Antártica Chilena Region, Chile.

See also
 List of islands of Chile

External links
 Islands of Chile @ United Nations Environment Programme
 World island information @ WorldIslandInfo.com
 South America Island High Points above 1000 meters
 United States Hydrographic Office, South America Pilot (1916)

Islands of Magallanes Region
Última Esperanza Province